The Miss Perú 1982 pageant was held on June 23, 1982. That year, 24 candidates were competing for the national crown. The chosen winners represented Peru at the Miss Universe 1982 and Miss World 1982. The rest of the finalists would enter in different pageants.

Placements

Special Awards

 Best Regional Costume - Ancash - Rita Tresierra
 Miss Photogenic - Piura - Cynthia Piedra
 Miss Elegance - San Martín - Erika Schaefer
 Miss Body - Ucayali - Bárbara Codina
 Best Hair - Tacna - Úrsula Lahoud
 Miss Congeniality - Cajamarca - Mariela Monier
 Most Beautiful Face - Piura - Cynthia Piedra

.

Delegates

Amazonas - Marisol Pereyra
Ancash - Rita Tresierra
Apurímac - Beatriz Osorio
Arequipa - Rosario Becerra
Cajamarca - Mariela Monier
Cuzco - Mercedes Saenz
Distrito Capital  - Francesca Zaza
Europe Perú - Virginia Van Heurck
Huánuco - Virginia Sara Bauer 
Ica - Myra Cabrera
Junín - Rubi Salazar
La Libertad - Monica Gonzales

Lambayeque - Patricia Campos
Loreto - Maisa Lopez
Madre de Dios - Rosa Galvez
Moquegua - Analissa Vaccari
Pasco - Ingerborg Bernaola
Piura - Cynthia Piedra
Puno - Rosario Murillo
San Martín - Erika Schaefer
Tacna - Úrsula Lahoud
Tumbes - Gina Garduzzi
Ucayali - Bárbara Codina 
USA Peru - Elizabeth Karsmersky

References 

Miss Peru
1982 in Peru
1982 beauty pageants